Automobiles Martini is a constructor of Formula racing cars from France, founded by Renato "Tico" Martini in 1965, when Martini and partner Bill Knight founded the Winfield Racing School at the Magny-Cours circuit, in France. Martini's first car was the MW3, a Formula Three car built in 1968.

Although better known for their successful efforts in Formula Three, Formula Renault and other lower formulae during the 1970s and 1980s, they are also known for having taken part in nine rounds of the 1978 Formula One season with the single MK23 chassis, giving René Arnoux (later a driver for Renault and Ferrari) his debut in Formula One. Future four time World Drivers' Champion Alain Prost also used a Renault powered Martini to win the 1978 and 1979 French Formula Three Championship while driving for French team Oreca.

With Reynard, Ralt and Dallara crowding out the F3 market in the late 1980s, Martini reduced their customer program, keeping a stubborn presence in the French F3 championship during the 1990s, until Tico Martini finally sold the team to Guy Ligier in 2004.

Complete Formula One results
(key) (results in bold indicate pole position)

References 
Grand Prix encyclopedia profile
Formula One results

External links 
Automobiles Ligier-Martini

Formula One constructors
Formula One entrants
Formula Two constructors
French auto racing teams
French racecar constructors
French Formula 3 teams